Donald Baird Marron (July 21, 1934 – December 6, 2019) was an American financier, private equity investor and entrepreneur, notable as the chairman and chief executive officer of brokerage firm Paine Webber from 1980 through the sale of the company in 2000, as well as the founder of private equity firm Lightyear Capital and of Data Resources Inc.  He was the father of the economist Donald B. Marron Jr.

Career

D.B. Marron & Company
In 1959, Marron founded D.B. Marron & Company.  In 1965, Marron sold his company to Mitchell Hutchins and in 1967 was named president of the company.

Mitchell, Hutchins & Co.
Mitchell, Hutchins & Co. was a leading equity research boutique in the U.S., ranked the number 3 firm by Institutional Investor in 1974. In 1975, a national poll of portfolio managers chose the institutional brokerage firm as the “best research house on Wall Street.”  Under Marron's leadership, the firm grew to be known as "one of Wall Street's premier stock research firms."

In 1977, Mitchell Hutchins was acquired by Paine Webber. PaineWebber continued to use the Mitchell Hutchins brand until the company's sale to UBS in 2000. In 2001, the Mitchell Hutchins name was discontinued when it was merged as a subsidiary with UBS's Brinson Partners division.

Data Resources Inc.
In 1969 Marron co-founded Data Resources Inc. with Harvard University notable economist Otto Eckstein.  DRI became the largest non-governmental source of economic data and, working with Eckstein's theory of core inflation, developed the largest macroeconomic model of its era. Data Resources is credited with "breaking new ground for the practical use of economics" among business executives and others. The company went public in 1976, with 52 of the nation's 100 largest industrial corporations as clients.  The company was sold to McGraw-Hill in 1979 for $103 million.

Paine Webber
PaineWebber Group was one of the nation's leading full-service investment firms, serving its global client base through its primary businesses of banking, retail sales, capital transactions, and asset management.  In 1977, PaineWebber merged with Mitchell, Hutchins & Co., and Marron was named President of PaineWebber.  In 1980, Marron was named PaineWebber’s Chief Executive Officer, and in 1981, he was named Chairman of the Board of PaineWebber, roles he would hold for the next two decades. During his tenure, Marron transformed the business into a leading wealth management and institutional investment firm.

In 2000, as CEO, Marron engineered the sale of PaineWebber to UBS AG. The deal valued PaineWebber's outstanding share capital at $10.8 billion, representing an estimated 47 percent premium over PaineWebber's closing price the day prior to the deal's announcement, and a multiple of 18.1 times the company's estimated 2000 earnings at the time. The deal had the support of PaineWebber's major shareholders.

PaineWebber's sale to UBS AG expanded UBS's presence in the U.S. wealth management market. The deal was described as one of the most successful transactions of its time, having reached a record sale price and delivering clear benefits to shareholders, clients and employees of both companies. Marron served as Chairman of UBS America from 2000-2003.

Lightyear Capital

In 2000, Marron founded Lightyear Capital, a private equity firm focused on investments in financial services companies.  The firm has raised approximately $3.5 billion since inception across its four funds.  In May 2002, Lightyear closed on its first fund, The Lightyear Fund, with $750 million of investor commitments, approximately $500 million of which came from UBS AG. In 2006, the firm completed fundraising for its second private equity fund, with $850 million of commitments from over 40 investors. In 2012, the firm closed its third fund valued at $954 million. In late 2017, the firm closed its fourth fund with more than $950 million.

Art collector
Marron was one of America's most recognized private art collectors, having supported international artists and cultural institutions for more than 40 years. His collection of post-war works spanning both the 20th and 21st centuries is inspired by his personal response to art and his conviction that good contemporary art reflects—and great art anticipates—societal trends.

Under Marron's five-year term as President of the Museum of Modern Art's Board of Trustees in the late 1980s, the Museum's endowment more than doubled, growing from $26 million in 1985 to $59 million in 1990. As a Trustee, Marron oversaw the first expansion of the Museum Tower in 1984, in which MoMA more than doubled its gallery footprint, increased its curatorial department by 30 percent, and added an auditorium, two restaurants and a bookstore. MoMA's atrium is named the Donald B. and Catherine C. Marron Atrium, for Marron and his wife, in recognition of their contributions to the Museum's significant expansion efforts.

While at PaineWebber, Marron personally directed the firm's acquisition of more than 850 post-1945 works by major American and European artists—including Jasper Johns, Roy Lichtenstein, Willem de Kooning, and Susan Rothenberg, among many others—to create the PaineWebber Collection. In 2002, UBS PaineWebber promised MoMA 37 works, including paintings, drawings and sculpture by Andy Warhol (including Cagney, 1962), Roy Lichtenstein, Lucian Freud, and Jasper Johns. The donation was to be made over 15 years and was completed in 2017.

Non-profit and philanthropic work
In 2013, Marron provided the founding donation to launch the New York University Marron Institute of Urban Management. The Marron Institute operates on an academic venture capital model and works with cities to improve health, safety, mobility and inclusiveness. The Marron Institute is dedicated to working with residents, officials and practitioners to address pressing challenges on issues such as city planning, criminal justice and environmental health.

In 2012, Marron and Memorial Sloan Kettering Cancer Center established the Donald B. and Catherine C. Marron Cancer Metabolism Center to promote intensive studies focused on tumor metabolism. A key aspect of the Center is the Cell Metabolism Laboratory, which is a state-of-the-art facility that helps investigators characterize biological systems through direct measurement of the small molecule constituents.

Board memberships and other affiliations
Current
 Museum of Modern Art - President Emeritus and Lifetime Trustee
 New York University (NYU) - Life Trustee
 NYU Marron Institute of Urban Management - Founding Donor
 Memorial Sloan Kettering Cancer Center's Board of Overseers - Member
 Council on Foreign Relations - Member
 Partnership for New York City - Member
 Center for Strategic and International Studies (CSIS) - Trustee
 Coalition for the Homeless - Donor
 Center for the Study of the Presidency & Congress - Chairman Emeritus

Former
 Securities Industry Association (SIA) - Governor and Vice Chairman (1974-1977)
 New York Stock Exchange (NYSE) - Member of the Board of Directors (1974–81)
 Dana Foundation - Director (1978-2007)
 PaineWebber (as Chairman, 1981-2001)
 National Association of Securities Dealers (NASD) - Governor (1997-2001)
 Shinsei Bank - Director (1999-2005)
 Fannie Mae - Member of the Board (2001–06)
 President's Committee on the Arts and Humanities - Member (Former)
 California Institute of the Arts (CalArts) - Vice Chairman of the Board (Former)

Education
 Bronx High School of Science (January 1950)
 Attended Baruch College

Personal life
Marron was married to Catherine "Catie" C. Marron, whose career has encompassed investment banking, magazine journalism, and public service. Mrs. Marron is currently Chairman of the Board of Directors of the Friends of the High Line, a trustee of the New York Public Library—where she was Chairman of the Board for seven years—and a contributing editor to Vogue magazine. She is the creator and editor of City Parks (2013) and City Squares (2016), both published by HarperCollins.

Marron died of a heart attack on December 6, 2019 while on his way to a work party in New York City. He was 85.

References

Marron Q&A: The Buzz on Lightyear Capital.  Wall Street Journal, March 5, 2007
Lightyear's Marron eyeing banks, insurers.  Reuters, Nov 12, 2008
The Ubiquitous and Indefatigable Donald Marron.  New York Sun, September 21, 2005
United States: Golden start to golden years: Thank you UBS.  Global Finance,  September 2001

External links
Lightyear Capital (company website)
Donald Marron.  Charlie Rose Interviews

1934 births
2019 deaths
American art collectors
American bankers
American billionaires
American financiers
American philanthropists
Baruch College alumni
Businesspeople from New York City
People associated with the Museum of Modern Art (New York City)
People from Goshen, New York
Private equity and venture capital investors
The Bronx High School of Science alumni